Aerenea humerolineata is a species of beetle in the family Cerambycidae. It was described by Stephan von Breuning in 1980. It is known from Mexico.

References

Compsosomatini
Beetles described in 1980